The Sanderson House, also known as Sanderson Residence, was built in 1916.  Along with other Ward Wellington Ward-designed homes, it was listed on the National Register of Historic Places in 1997.

It was built in 1916 for Amon F. Sanderson, an officer of the Scottholm Company which developed the Scottholm Tract in 1911.  Sanderson also commissioned Sanderson House at 301 Scottholm Boulevard.

It was listed for its architecture.  The house exemplifies Ward's Arts and Crafts style and also Prairie Style.  It is one of five nearly identical homes in Syracuse designed by Ward.  The others are at 464 Allen Street, 100 Berkeley Drive, 1917 West Colvin Street, and 116 Rugby Road. It is located in the Scottholm Tract Historic District.

References

Houses in Syracuse, New York
National Register of Historic Places in Syracuse, New York
Houses on the National Register of Historic Places in New York (state)
Houses completed in 1916
Individually listed contributing properties to historic districts on the National Register in New York (state)